is a fictional universe setting primarily appearing in the Final Fantasy video game series. The world was created by Yasumi Matsuno and has since been expanded upon by several games as the Ivalice Alliance series. Ivalice is described as a complex world with a very long history, and the stories of Final Fantasy Tactics, Vagrant Story and Final Fantasy XII take place in it.

Though described often as a world, this was only physically true of Ivalice in Final Fantasy Tactics Advance, in which Ivalice was created parallel to the real world. The 'true' Ivalice, as witnessed in the remaining games, describes two distinct locations; a geographical region, and a smaller kingdom, both of which belong to a larger, unnamed world. Generally, however, the term Ivalice is also used to refer to the conceptual setting, rather as one might say the Medieval world of Europe and the Mediterranean.

Concept and creation
Ivalice was created by Yasumi Matsuno as a fictional world with its own identity; a medieval-like world where magic and machine exist together. The usual elements of Final Fantasy, such as Chocobos, crystals and magic spells, blend into the setting. This setting first appeared in Final Fantasy Tactics, a game developed by key staff members behind both Tactics Ogre (directed by Yasumi Matsuno) and Final Fantasy VI (directed by Hiroyuki Ito). It was also Matsuno's first project with Square following his departure from Quest in 1995. Matsuno's next game, Vagrant Story, featured several allusions to Final Fantasy Tactics,  and Matsuno said in 2004 that Vagrant Story, Final Fantasy Tactics, and Final Fantasy XII unfold quite close on the map of Ivalice, "a complex world with a very long history and the stories".

Following Matsuno's departure from Square Enix during development on Final Fantasy XII, Square Enix has continued to feature Ivalice in other games.

In 2011, Matsuno stated that he never originally intended for Vagrant Story to take place in Ivalice. As a result, any references he had made of Final Fantasy Tactics in Vagrant Story, as well as Vagrant Story references in Final Fantasy XII, only serve as "fan service".

Appearances

Video games

Final Fantasy Tactics (1997), a tactical role-playing game developed and published by Square for the PlayStation video game console, marked the first appearance of Ivalice. The game combined thematic elements of the Final Fantasy video game series with a game engine and battle system unlike those previously seen in the franchise. Final Fantasy Tactics is set in a medieval-inspired kingdom called Ivalice and created by Yasumi Matsuno. The game's story follows Ramza Beoulve, a highborn cadet who finds himself thrust into the middle of an intricate military conflict known as The Lion War, where two opposing noble factions are coveting the throne of the kingdom. As the story progresses, Ramza and his allies discover a sinister plot behind the war.

In an interview with Akito Inoue, an assistant professor at the International University of Japan, Inoue mentions that Final Fantasy Tactics was made because of how casual gamers are usually put off by games with branching storylines found in Matsuno's other titles such as Tactics Ogre.

Vagrant Story (2000) is an action role-playing game that focuses on weapon creation and modification, as well as elements of puzzle-solving and strategy. The game takes place in the kingdom of Valendia and the ruined city of Leá Monde. The story centers on Ashley Riot, an elite agent known as a Riskbreaker, who must travel to Leá Monde to investigate the link between a cult leader and a senior Valendian Parliament member, Duke Bardorba. In the prologue, Ashley is blamed for murdering the duke, and the game discloses the events that happen one week before the murder.

Final Fantasy Tactics Advance is a tactical role-playing game developed and published by Square for the Game Boy Advance. The game shares several traits with Final Fantasy Tactics, although it is not a direct sequel. The game's story centers on four children; Marche, Mewt, Ritz, and Doned, who live in a small town named St. Ivalice. The children are transported to a realm of the same name as their town, "Ivalice", after discovering an ancient magical book. The story then focuses on the exploits of Marche as he attempts to return to the real world while facing opposition from those around him.

Development on the game began when Square announced its publishing agreement with Nintendo, and was later confirmed by the producer Matsuno. The development team of Tactics Advance, Square's Product Development Division 4, was constructed from employees of Quest Corporation, and work began in February 2002. This comes after Quest announced the handover of its software development team to Square, of which the former is famed for its Tactics Ogre series.

Final Fantasy XII (2006) is a role-playing video game developed and published by Square Enix for the PlayStation 2 platform. It is the twelfth title in the mainline Final Fantasy series. The game introduced several innovations to the offline titles in the mainline series: an open world, a seamless battle system, a controllable camera, a customizable "gambit" system which lets the player automatically control the actions of characters and a "license" system which determines which abilities and equipment are used by characters.

The game takes place in the land of Ivalice, where the empires of Archadia and Rozarria are waging an endless war. Dalmasca, a small kingdom, is caught between the warring nations. When Dalmasca is annexed by Archadia, its princess, Ashe, creates a resistance movement. During the struggle, she meets Vaan, a young adventurer who dreams of becoming a sky pirate in command of an airship. They are quickly joined by a band of allies; together, they rally against the tyranny of the Archadian Empire.

The game's sequel, Final Fantasy XII: Revenant Wings, was joined by other games in a new subseries known as the Ivalice Alliance. Final Fantasy Tactics: The War of the Lions is a PlayStation Portable and iOS port of the original FF Tactics game. Final Fantasy Tactics A2: Grimoire of the Rift is a Nintendo DS sequel to Final Fantasy Tactics Advance, albeit set in the actual Ivalice world and not an artificial illusory world, unlike its predecessor. Another title in the collection, Final Fantasy XII International Zodiac Job System, was released on August 9, 2007 in Japan.

Executive producer Akitoshi Kawazu explained that the aim of the Ivalice Alliance is to "spread the word about the world of Ivalice", and to bring more players into the franchise, with new titles not restricted to the standard role-playing game genre but also tactical games and games similar to Vagrant Story. Revenant Wings director Motomu Toriyama noted that with the large and original team that worked on Final Fantasy XII, Ivalice became more Square Enix's world than that of the former Quest team, and that the Ivalice Alliance world is thus slightly more influenced by Final Fantasy XII than the earlier Ivalice titles.

Crystal Defenders is a series of turn-based strategy video games developed by MSF/Winds and published by Square Enix. It comprises several iterations released for mobile phones and through online video game delivery services. The games are set in the world of Ivalice and features job classes, monsters and summoned creatures from the tactical role-playing game Final Fantasy Tactics A2: Grimoire of the Rift.

Fortress is the code name of a cancelled action role-playing game that was in development by Grin. Director Ulf Andersson devised the concept for Fortress and pre-production began in the second half of 2008. During development, Square Enix approached the developer and proposed making the game a spin-off of Final Fantasy XII. Grin reconceived the game in the recurring Final Fantasy world of Ivalice, and included elements of XII such as stylistic motifs and character designs; additional elements included Chocobos and other recurring creatures from the Final Fantasy series. It was to be released on the Microsoft Windows, PlayStation 3, and Xbox 360 platforms.

During development, Square Enix did not pay Grin over several months, and disapproved of the game's Nordic art style. Grin worked to bring the game's art style closer to the Final Fantasy series, but after six months of development was told that no funding would ever come from Square Enix, and the developer filed for bankruptcy several days later. Word of the project leaked out through art portfolios of those who worked on the project and even a tech demo surfaced. In 2011, Fortress was thought to have been in development by an undisclosed studio, but this was also suspended and the game was not released in any form.

Final Fantasy Tactics S is a tactical role-playing game with social features and multiplayer battles. It was released in Japan on the Mobage social gaming network in May 2013. The mobile game ended its service on July 31, 2014.

Final Fantasy XIV (2013) contains numerous references and homages to Ivalice games, though the writers maintain that there is no direct connection between the two fictional worlds. In October 2017, Square Enix released a patch for the Stormblood expansion titled "The Legend Returns". This patch includes a raid series called Return to Ivalice, which was written and directed by Matsuno. This scenario adapts characters and plot elements of Final Fantasy XII and Tactics into an original story set in the world of Final Fantasy XIV. Future patches as well as Shadowbringerss Save the Queen storyline, also written and directed by Matsuno, continue this story while the expansion has the Viera as a playable race, with males making their series debut in the Endwalker expansion.

Other media
In Japan, Final Fantasy Tactics Advance'''s story was expanded and broadcast in Japanese radio stations. The radio drama entitled Final Fantasy Tactics Advance Radio Edition was broadcast in four radio stations within Japan from early January to late March 2003.Final Fantasy XII was adapted into a manga by Gin Amou. Square Enix published the series in a total of five tankōbon volumes from December 22, 2006 to August 22, 2009.

Setting
Geography
Kingdom of Ivalice

The events of Final Fantasy Tactics are set in the kingdom of Ivalice, which borders Ordalia in the east and the insular nation of Romanda in the north-west, from which it is separated by the Larner Channel. The kingdom forms a peninsula and is composed of seven provinces which were individual kingdoms before their unification: Gallione, Lionel, Lesalia, Fovoham, Limberry, Zeltennia and Mullonde.

The insular province of Mullonde is home to the Glabados Church and is ruled separately from the royal government. In the game's backstory, Mullonde's territory was once connected to the mainland, but was mostly submerged by a disaster involving the Zodiac Stones and which occurred soon after Saint Ajora's execution, with its city made into a Necrohol, a city of the dead. The city of Bervenia, Ajora's birthplace, is governed by the Church although it is enclosed in the province of Lesalia.

Prior to the events of Final Fantasy Tactics, the Fara church dominated the kingdom of Ivalice. The remake of the original game, Final Fantasy Tactics: The War of the Lions, refers to the Fara Church as Pharism. The life of Ajora saw Fara replaced with the new Glabados church which, by the time of the game, is the major religion of the kingdom. Glabados is monotheistic and intensely political, underscoring much of Ivalice history. Followers of Glabados use the word "Faram" to affirm their prayers. During the events of the game, the church is revealed to have put a large spin on history, particularly the events surrounding the life of Ajora, a messianic figure.

Leá MondeVagrant Story is set in the ruins of the city of Leá Monde. The kingdom of Valendia is also heavily mentioned, and a few of its locations are featured in the prologue and the ending sequence. In contrast to the other Ivalice games, magic is rare, being suppressed by religious doctrine. Other races are never mentioned.Vagrant Story centers around the "Dark", a formless, invisible entity. In places where the Dark runs strongest, those who died will have their corpses controlled by the dark, becoming the undead. The Dark exists within a person as negative energy that unleashes the individual's latent power. Throughout the story, many individuals crave the powers of the Dark, which centers around the abandoned city of Leá Monde. Another mythological aspect of Vagrant Story is the Kiltia, an ancient cult which built itself upon the Dark and ancient sorcery, and of which the Müllenkamp sect is stemmed from. It can be seen that most rituals and summoning performed in the game involved ancient Kildean magic.

In Vagrant Story, the Iocus priesthood of the kingdom of Valendia is shown to use the Kildean rood as a symbol, although they follow the teachings of a saint named Iocus instead of the original Kildean teachings of the Kiltia religion of Leá Monde. Müllenkamp, founder of the city of Leá Monde featured in the story, used to be a priestess of Kiltia, and bore the rood on her back. The followers of St. Iocus are outwardly intolerant of magic, seeing it as an abomination, and yet its higher members continue to use it behind the scenes. This hypocrisy is revealed over the course of the story, though it goes unresolved.

St. Ivalice
In Final Fantasy Tactics Advance, the protagonist lives in a land called St. Ivalice. Following the characters' discovery of the book called the Gran Grimoire, St. Ivalice was transformed into a "mirror" of the "real" kingdom of Ivalice. The races seen in the world of Tactics Advance — Bangaa, Moogle, Viera and Nu Mou — also appear in the game Final Fantasy XII, the setting of which has come to represent the "real" Ivalice. This is apparently explained as Mewt (one of the main characters in Final Fantasy Tactics Advance) replied that Final Fantasy was his favorite game. Final Fantasy Tactics A2: Grimoire of the Rift also takes place in both St. Ivalice and the Ivalice of Final Fantasy XII.

Galtean Peninsula

In Final Fantasy XII, Ivalice covers three continents, Ordalia, Valendia and Kerwon. The demography consists of the known races: Humes, Bangaa, Viera, Seeq and Moogles, and other  minority races. Civilization is advanced in this world where the use of a magical stone called magicite is extensive in everyday life, airships are a prominent transportation and multi-story buildings cover the cityscape. Ivalice in XII is based on a mixture of cultures. According to the game developers, these designs are inspired from a mixture of medieval Mediterranean countries, Turkish architecture, art-deco from Indian architecture, the cityscape of New York City and the Arabic culture found hidden in European countries. As such, many patterns are featured as geometrical and Arabesque in shape. The cityscape is also conceived by Matsuno as being dirty and weather-worn, mirroring the conditions of a medieval landscape. The natural landscape also mirrors Earth's geographical features, including large expanse of deserts and snowy mountains.

In Final Fantasy XII, the continents in Ivalice are presently home to three nations: Rozarria, Archadia and Dalmasca. There was once the Kingdom of Nabradia and the Republic of Landis in Valendia, now either destroyed or assimilated into the Archadian Empire. Strategically located between the rival neighboring empires of Archadia and Rozarria, Dalmasca's position as a neutral buffer region between the two countries is eliminated when it is invaded by Archadia at the onset of the game. With the fall of Landis and Nabradia and its reduction to an occupied territory under Archadian rule, Dalmasca is set to play a central role in the still-heated dispute between its neighbors, which is escalating once more.

The events of XII are focused on the area around the Galtean Peninsula, itself located in the larger Ivalice region.Memoirs of Marquis Halim Ondore IV  This area of Ivalice is diverse in both geography and climate, ranging from the hilly, clement grasslands of southern Valendia to the deserts of Dalmasca. In Kerwon, south of Dalmasca, the lands are arid at lower altitudes, though the higher elevations are the only places in the region known to receive snow. The north of Kerwon is heavily forested, home to the dense Golmore Jungle, within which lies the magical Feywood.Golmore Jungle (Sage Knowledge 72 of 78), Clan Primer Bestiary 

These various micro-climates are influenced by the magical phenomenon known as Mist, an unstable substance with the ability to cause great variation over small areas. Due to the influence of Mist, several areas of Ivalice are 'jagd', areas in which Mist-laden winds and magicite-rich soil interfere with airship mechanisms. As such, jagds tend to be harsh, lawless frontiers, uncontrolled by any nation. Physically, the peninsula area resembles Europe in the east, with the landmasses of Valendia, Ordalia and Kerwon surrounding a central body of water (the Naldoan Sea) on three sides. To the west, Valendia and Kerwon curve away from Ordalia, creating the Galtean Peninsula.

Mist is responsible for the existence of 'magicite', stones that contain magical powers due to the presence of Mist in their crystalline structure. Magicite is divided into three types; spellstones that are used in spell casting, skystones that are installed into a component known as 'glossair rings' that give flight to the vehicles, whether small-sized bikes or large airships, and memstones that function much like recording devices. The quality of magicite depends on the quantity of Mist and not on the size or shape of the stone. The ubiquitousness of magic and magicite, as well as its cost-efficiency, led to it replacing electricity and its various sources as the dominant usable energy in Ivalice.

Nethicite, another type of magicite, works by absorbing Mist, thus nullifying the effects of magic and storing vast amounts of power. Nethicite can be described as either deifacted or manufactured (literally, god-made or man-made). During the course of the game, it is discovered that deifacted nethicite is nethicite created by the Occuria, and that the ultimate source of known pieces of deifacted nethicite is the Sun-Cryst they created. Deifacted nethicite contains a large amount of magic and is known to influence the history of Ivalice.

In Final Fantasy XII, the Light of Kiltia, a polytheistic religion, is the dominant church in Ivalice, having influence in the political affairs of the region around the Galtean Peninsula. Despite this, the church maintains an apolitical stance, with its most high-ranking officials banned from participating in political affairs altogether. At its head is the Gran Kiltias, being the Helgas Anastasis at the time of the game's plot, until his death during the events of the story. Like Glabados followers in Final Fantasy Tactics, Kiltias swear on the name of Faram, the Father of All, in the manner of the Christian amen. The Final Fantasy XII Ultimania Ω guide considers the Glabados Church a possible branch of Kiltia.

Purvama Lemurés
Some of the locations in the Ivalice of Final Fantasy XII returned in its sequel, Revenant Wings, along with a new area called Lemurés. A legendary Purvama (Floating Continent) raised into the skies by the god Feolthanos long ago, this land is ruled by three "Sacred Crystals" called Auraliths, which erected a barrier to shield the Purvama from the rest of the world. In Revenant Wings, the "Legend of the Floating Land" has become an ambition for Sky Pirates who seek the island for Auracite, pieces of Auralith able to allow one to summon entities called Yarhi. The ruins of Lemurés are where the Aegyl reside. During the course of the game, the main characters learn that the sealing of Lemurés was the work of the Occuria, whom Feolthanos defied prior to using the Auralith to become a god-like being.

In the backstory of Revenant Wings, Feolthanos established a personality cult over Lemurés, labeling himself to his people as a god. Though Lemurés still had a sense of peace and paradise, in spite of Yarhi attacks, it was a false paradise due to the Aurcite draining the Aegyl of their anima as part of Feolthanos' plan to destroy Ivalice as revenge against the Occurians.

Jylland
Taking place only a few years after Final Fantasy XII: Revenant Wings, Final Fantasy Tactics A2: Grimoire of the Rift introduces a new region of Ivalice called Jylland. The region of Jylland is made up of the western half of the Ordalia Continent and the eastern half of the Loar Continent, with Jagd Zellea to the north of the two continents. There are five regions spread out across these two continents, which consist of smaller territories inside of them, twenty being the number of territories throughout Jylland, which contain a varying number of areas (battlefields) in each of them (eighty-six areas in all of Jylland). The towns in Jylland include Camoa, Grazston, Moorabella, Fluorgis, and Goug. Goug in particular, is a town of Moogles. Another race similar to the Aegyl also was introduced along with this game. Called Gria, these winged females are small, but pack a mean punch, specializing in three new classes and one old one. Geomancer, Ravager, and Raptor, along with the before-human exclusive class Hunter were given to the Gria, and only the geomancer class uses magic.

Timeline

The timeline of Ivalice as presented in the games was left quite vague, and formerly other official sources had said little on the matter. A few sources have made their own conclusion on the timeline of Ivalice. The official timeline, however, was eventually given in the Final Fantasy XII Ultimania Omega, and placed the events of Final Fantasy XII before those of Final Fantasy Tactics.

There is no direct mention of Ivalice in Vagrant Story. However, several references are made; the Kingdom of Valendia, the setting for Vagrant Story, shares its name with a continent of Ivalice appearing in Final Fantasy XII. The Kiltia religion, featured in XII, was the religion of the ghost town Leá Monde, in which the story takes place. Additionally, a quotation from Arazlam J. Durai, a famous historian of Ivalice who lived 400 years after the War of the Lions (and narrator of the Zodiac Brave Story told in Final Fantasy Tactics), is used at the beginning of the game, and the descriptions of several items make direct reference to the same story. This would seem to place Vagrant Story latest in the timeline, given its direct references to the events of Final Fantasy Tactics. Matsuno has said that he never intended Vagrant Story to be in the same world as Tactics and Final Fantasy XII, though he noted that Square Enix advertising might not agree.

Some confusion still persists, particularly due to the facts surrounding Saint Ajora, who was executed 1200 years prior to the events of Final Fantasy Tactics, yet in the Clan Primer of Final Fantasy XII is said to have separated from the Light of Kiltia religion shortly after its foundation, already two thousand years old. This is the result of a mistranslation, as the Japanese text places Ajora's birth some decades after the events of Final Fantasy XII.

Races
The populations seen in Final Fantasy Tactics and Vagrant Story are essentially human. The other intelligent races who appear are hostile or monster-like, such as Goblins or Ogres. Friendly intelligent races appear in later games set in Ivalice, where the human race is called Humes. Monsters and the like are thought not to exist by the general populace in Vagrant Story, with the monsters in the isolated Leá Monde all stemming from the Dark. The races are sorted by appearance and then according to the alphabetical order.

Ivalice as featured in Final Fantasy Tactics Advance is populated by four main intelligent races in addition to Humes, all of them also reappearing in Final Fantasy XII:

 The  are a reptilian race living almost twice as long as Humes. Being a very socially and cognitively advanced race, they hate being called "lizards" as this is regarded as an offensive slur. Bangaa in Final Fantasy XII are often considered to be the most integrated of all races into Hume society, and are the race most friendly with the latter, as exemplified with Migelo. Bangaa possess great agility and strength, and acute senses of hearing and smell, making them excellent hunters and fighters. However, their eyesight is so poor that some wear blindfolds as part of their clothing. Their magical abilities are generally poor due to problems their unique mouth gives them when chanting magic spells. To make up for this, some Bangaa have developed exclusive high level spells for the race to use. They are also said to be distantly related to lizard men.
 The  are a resourceful race known to be skillful in mechanics and engineering; they were the pioneers of airship construction. They have longer, rabbit-like ears and tend to have more beige or gray fur. In Final Fantasy Tactics Advance, the player is guided through the world of Ivalice by the moogles Montblanc and Nono. In Final Fantasy XII, these two characters return albeit with different roles. Although Moogles were featured in Final Fantasy Tactics only as summoned creatures, their race is mentioned in the backstory as having once lived in the Siedge Weald.

 The  are a dog-like race. They are short and hunched; half the size of an adult Hume, are adept in magic and can speak with monsters. The Nu Mou's lifespan is three times longer than that of a Hume. Two Nu Mou, Babus Swain and Ezel Berbier, appear as optional playable characters in Final Fantasy Tactics Advance. All of the races have an infinite number of possible playable characters, but these two are the only Nu Mou with special sprites. In Final Fantasy XII, most of the Nu Mou appear as acolytes of the Kiltia religion, found mainly in Mt. Bur-Omisace.

 The  are a rabbit-like race that can live three times as long as a Hume, and divided into two subraces: The light-skinned Veena and dark-skinned Rava. The Viera have rabbit or deer-like features, most notably their long ears. Their feet are shaped in such a way that in order to stand they must wear high heels. Their slender forms heighten their senses and speed, and although their defense is low, Viera agility and finesse are unmatched by the other races. In Final Fantasy Tactics Advance, Vieras have blue-white, pale green, or purple-white hair, with only a few having hair that is pure white, which is considered to be a blessing. Viera can listen to the surrounding nature and sense Mist, and can sometimes go berserk from feeling an overwhelmingly vast quantity of active Mist. In Final Fantasy XII, they live in hidden villages deep within the vast forests of Ivalice. The Viera believe themselves to be intimately tied to the "Wood", a part of the forests themselves, and are rarely involved in matters outside the wood. A Viera that moves out of the forest, like Fran, is considered an outcast and dead to her people. Mixed breeds of Veena and Rava Viera have accustomed themselves to coexist within Hume society, dyeing their white hair.Final Fantasy XII introduces several other races to Ivalice, with varying importance in the plot of the game:

 The  are a green-skinned humanoid race. Their bodies are relatively small in stature; even as an adult, their height is only the size of a child Hume. After the kingdom of Nabradia ceased to exist, they designated the Necrohol of Nabudis as their stronghold. The Baknamy are sensitive to the air that they breathe, and living where the air is polluted due to the city's destruction forces them to wear gas masks. The poorer and less fortunate Baknamy commit crimes to earn a living, targeting adventurers and travelers, causing Humes to view them as a despicable race.
 The 　of XII are depicted as large, thick-furred appreciators of nature and the arts of war, but disliking unnecessary violence. They have high smelling and hearing senses, which make them able hunters. The Garif prefer to adorn themselves with natural ornaments of animal bones and stones over crafted objects, with the exception of a traditional mask which is worn from birth to death. Their villages are sparsely located in the Bancour Region, and each is governed by a council led by a High Elder. Relations with other races are peaceful but rare. Garif merchants are known to trade with the nomads of Giza Plains and the Dalmascans, exchanging items such as Bancour spices. In ancient times, the Occuria granted the Garif nethicite, however the Garif's dislike for violence hindered them from using its power.
 The  are a long-living, highly intelligent race. Helgas are white-haired, tall, thin, and have long limbs. They can communicate telepathically while asleep, and also probe into the dreams of others. Gran Kiltias Anastasis is the only Helgas who appears within Final Fantasy XII.
 The  are a minor, feline race that appears in Skycity Bhujerba. They are deeply cultured and a bit aristocratic, and act as advisors and representatives for Marquis Halim Ondore the IV.
 The  are a powerful and agile porcine race possessing low intellect and described as barely able to speak human languages. Though somewhat cowardly, they are often hired as mercenaries, guards, or hunters, with a significant amount going into thievery. The Seeq are also attracted by shiny objects, often adorning themselves with such. Seeq often adorn themselves with markings of sorts, the most common being something that resembles a smiley face on their chest. Males and Females are almost impossible to distinguish, the only real sign being that females often wear some clothing on their upper bodies.
 The  are the "Lords and Masters of the Great Sea", a name bestowed befitting their presence in the Yensa Sandsea and mastery in taming the Yensa fish for travel. Evolved from crustaceans, their bodies are thin and entirely covered by layers of clothing, which the game's Bestiary states is either to hide their ugly bodies or to keep themselves protected from the sun. The Urutan-Yensa divided into separate tribes ruled by a queen able to speak the Hume language, and are strictly territorial, attacking anyone who enters their lands. Urutan-Yensa are particularly proud and attached to honor so much that requesting the aid of others outside their race results in a death penalty. They sometimes exile tribe members that show unusual aggressive and violent nature, known as the Urutan-Exile.Final Fantasy XII: Revenant Wings introduces two other races:

 The  is a winged, humanlike race appearing in Revenant Wings. These wings count as both a blessing (able to fly in the air) and a curse (resulting in a short lifespan of 40 years). The Aegyl dwell in the ruins of the Lemurés. They are a people without emotion and thus have no true conflict amongst themselves, but there are a few who tend to go against the will of their people; such as Llyud. But overtime, as Auraliths were being destroyed, the Aegyl regained their emotions, with some feeling mostly rage on the sky pirates who terrorized them and Ivalice for its sins against them. Their race departed from Ivalice when Lemurés crumbled.
 The  is a sub-race of the Viera, characterized by light blond hair and shorter ears than standard Viera. They are the descendants of the Aegyl chief Feolthanos who fell in love with a full-blood Viera. The Feol were from birth treated as exiles by their full blood kin, cast out of the Wood to take refuge at Roda Volcano, where none dare enter. Since they have no wings, Feolthanos left the airship Galbana and the Auracite in the hopes that one day they come to him. His inheritance was received by Mydia/Judge of Wings, who decimated all that remained of his progeny to ensure that her people would never learn the truth behind their patriarch.

Lastly, Final Fantasy Tactics A2: Grimoire of the Rift features two other races:

 The  are a winged, humanoid race in Grimoire of the Rift. The Gria are born with dragon-like wings and horns, and excel at physical combat. All Gria featured in the game are female, but it is never stated whether all members are female or if males exist.
 The Revgaji are a subspecies of the above-mentioned Rev race. Their features are not as feline but they do share the pointed ears. Cid and Lezaford are members of this race.

Mythos
Within Final Fantasy Tactics, legends revolve around the Zodiac Brave Story, which deals with twelve knights who used the power of Zodiac Stones—magical stones engraved with symbols of the twelve Zodiac constellations—to fight against a demon summoned by an ambitious king to control Ivalice. This myth was twisted by the Glabados Church, as explained in the game's backstory, by including St. Ajora as the leader of the Zodiac Braves.

The "Lucavi" are demons linked to the twelve Zodiac Stones who seek to gain control of Ivalice by resurrecting their defeated leader, the High Seraph, Ultima. Any person who holds a Zodiac Stone may make a contract with the Lucavian demon associated with it, and in doing so, become one with that demon. During the events of the game, the Lucavi manipulate the Glabados Church into controlling the War of the Lions to ensure enough bloodshed for Ultima's resurrection. A thirteenth Lucavi, associated with the sun constellation Ophiuchus, can also be found in a side-quest. Some of the Lucavi reappear as Totema in Final Fantasy Tactics Advance, while a sub-boss, Gukko, becomes a "Rukavi" before his final encounter with the party, with an appearance similar to that of a vampire-type enemy. They also reappear in Final Fantasy XII as summoned Espers—with backstories that describe how they became known as Lucavi. It is also revealed that they were creations of the Occuria from XII. In the new translation of the PSP version of Final Fantasy Tactics, the Zodiac Stones are also referred to as Auracite—the same stone used to summon the Yarhi and Scions (the Lucavi) in Final Fantasy XII: Revenant Wings.Final Fantasy XII also introduces the "Occuria", immortal beings who have no visible faces, only a pair of glowing yellow eyes seen under their floating shell-like armor, surrounded by an aquamarine aura. The Occuria can become selectively invisible, and are also capable of possession, shape-shifting and image projection. Referred to by some as gods, but unknown to the main religions in Ivalice, the Occuria race played a central role in the history of Ivalice, controlling all major events, such as the rise of the Dynast-King Raithwall. Though peace fostered in Ivalice in the four-hundred year rule after Raithwall, the Occurian Venat, apparently disgusted with its kind's manipulations, rebelled and gave the secret of Nethicite to the Archadia's Dr. Cid and Vayne to overthrow the Occuria and make mankind the masters of their own fate. The events of the game eventually provoke the end the "Age of Stones" (the Occuria's control over Ivalice). In Final Fantasy XII: Revenant Wings, the Occuria were revealed to have played a part in the sealing of the Purvama Lemurés long ago, which by the present time became a land of legend that many Sky Pirates sought for its Auracite.Revenant Wings also introduced beings known as the "Yarhi". Also known as "Espers" to those on Ivalice, they are powerful entities created from anima, spiritual energy. Through certain elements, such as Auracite or Mist, the Yarhi can assume physical form until they are defeated in battle. They are summoned by the wielders of Auracite and obey their every command. Fourteen such Yarhi appeared in Final Fantasy XII; the first thirteen being the Lucavi from Final Fantasy Tactics which are referred as the "Scions of darkness", magical beings created by Occuria with great strength and intelligence. Led by Ultima, they eventually rebelled for various reasons and engaged themselves in a war dubbed the Thousand Year War against the gods, but they were eventually defeated. Consequently, the gods bound their existence with the Glyph of the Beast, trapping them within the Mist. Any who controls the Glyph in turn controls the Scion, allowing them to operate as summoned creatures. The Fourteenth is the legendary swordsman Gilgamesh, who collects the swords of those he defeats in battle. While most fight, few like Cu Sith and the Sahaguin Namingway offer aid in other ways. Also, the viera job "Summoner" can call and use the powers of mythological gods like Kirin, Shiva, and many others.

Reception
Editorials from the gaming website RPGamer.com outlined several similarities between the Catholic Church and the Church of Glabados portrayed in Final Fantasy Tactics. One editorial noted that it was a controversial move by the developers, as if the church institution "in fact worships a demon, and is evil from its god on down". However, another editorial mentions that such controversies failed to recognize the church in question is the medieval Roman Catholic Church, and that historically such institution is known for its flaws in the past.

The Ivalice of Final Fantasy XII is considered a Japanese take on the Star Wars galaxy by a GameSpot reviewer (in turn, Star Wars was considered an American take on Japanese jidaigeki samurai films, specifically Akira Kurosawa's The Hidden Fortress). Even with the established fantasy setting, the airships and air battles gives the world a science-fiction feel. Adding to the "galaxy far, far away" mood is the mingling of different races within large cities and the political unrest between the rebellion and the Empire. Because the characters primarily traverse on foot, the world of XII feels vast, and reviewers enjoyed sightseeing because of the impressive visuals.

Eurogamer praised the "beautiful architecture and interaction of the various races" in Final Fantasy XII and noted that there was a "melancholy feeling" to "wandering the barren wastes" of Ivalice. In their review of Final Fantasy Tactics, IGN called the battle areas "extremely well designed and detailed to perfection", singling out the churches as especially beautiful. GameSpot was similarly impressed with the wide varieties of "beautiful" terrains to be seen in Ivalice, from swamps to castles to "anything else you can think of". PSXExtreme praised the feel of Lea Monde in Vagrant Story'', calling it "excellently lit" in a style that brought out the "dark and moody" feeling of the game. They went on to say that the game's "great visual presentation will go down in the books as one of the best looking [PlayStation] games".

See also
 Spira (Final Fantasy)

References

Fantasy worlds
Fictional regions
Fictional populated places
Final Fantasy
Video game locations